Computational archaeology describes computer-based analytical methods for the study of long-term human behaviour and behavioural evolution. As with other sub-disciplines that have prefixed 'computational' to their name (e.g., computational biology, computational physics and computational sociology), the term is reserved for (generally mathematical) methods that could not realistically be performed without the aid of a computer.

Computational archaeology may include the use of geographical information systems (GIS), especially when applied to spatial analyses such as viewshed analysis and least-cost path analysis as these approaches are sufficiently computationally complex that they are extremely difficult if not impossible to implement without the processing power of a computer. Likewise, some forms of statistical and mathematical modelling, and the computer simulation of human behaviour and behavioural evolution using software tools such as Swarm or Repast would also be impossible to calculate without computational aid. The application of a variety of other forms of complex and bespoke software to solve archaeological problems, such as human perception and movement within built environments using software such as University College London's Space Syntax program, also falls under the term 'computational archaeology'.

The acquisition, documentation and analysis of archaeological finds at excavations and in museums is an important field having pottery analysis as one of the major topics. In this area 3D-acquisition techniques like structured light scanning (SLS), photogrammetric methods like "structure from motion" (SfM), computed tomography as well as their combinations provide large data-sets of numerous objects for digital pottery research. These techniques are increasingly integrated into the in-situ workflow of excavations. The Austrian subproject of the Corpus vasorum antiquorum (CVA) is seminal for digital research on finds within museums.

Computational archaeology is also known as "archaeological informatics"  (Burenhult 2002, Huggett and Ross 2004) or "archaeoinformatics" (sometimes abbreviated as "AI", but not to be confused with artificial intelligence).

Origins and objectives 
In recent years, it has become clear that archaeologists will only be able to harvest the full potential of quantitative methods and computer technology if they become aware of the specific pitfalls and potentials inherent in the archaeological data and research process. AI science is an emerging discipline that attempts to uncover, quantitatively represent and explore specific properties and patterns of archaeological information. Fundamental research on data and methods for a self-sufficient archaeological approach to information processing produces quantitative methods and computer software specifically geared towards archaeological problem solving and understanding.

AI science is capable of complementing and enhancing almost any area of scientific archaeological research. It incorporates a large part of the methods and theories developed in quantitative archaeology since the 1960s but goes beyond former attempts at quantifying archaeology by exploring ways to represent general archaeological information and problem structures as computer algorithms and data structures. This opens archaeological analysis to a wide range of computer-based information processing methods fit to solve problems of great complexity. It also promotes a formalized understanding of the discipline's research objects and creates links between archaeology and other quantitative disciplines, both in methods and software technology. Its agenda can be split up in two major research themes that complement each other:

Fundamental research (theoretical AI science) on the structure, properties and possibilities of archaeological data, inference and knowledge building. This includes modeling and managing fuzziness and uncertainty in archaeological data, scale effects, optimal sampling strategies and spatio-temporal effects.
Development of computer algorithms and software (applied AI science) that make this theoretical knowledge available to the user.

There is already a large body of literature on the use of quantitative methods and computer-based analysis in archaeology. The development of methods and applications is best reflected in the annual publications of the  CAA conference (see external links section at bottom). At least two journals, the Italian Archeologia e Calcolatori and the British Archaeological Computing Newsletter, are dedicated to archaeological computing methods. AI Science contributes to many fundamental research topics, including but not limited to:

 advanced statistics in archaeology, spatial and temporal archaeological data analysis
 bayesian analysis and advanced probability models, fuzziness and uncertainty in archaeological data
 scale-related phenomena and scale transgressions
 intrasite analysis (representations of stratigraphy, 3D analysis, artefact distributions)
 landscape analysis (territorial modeling, visibility analysis)
 optimal survey and sampling strategies
 process-based modeling and simulation models
 archaeological predictive modeling and heritage management applications
 supervised and unsupervised classification and typology, artificial intelligence applications
 digital excavations and virtual reality
 computational reproducibility of archaeological research
 archaeological software development, electronic data sharing and publishing

AI science advocates a formalized approach to archaeological inference and knowledge building. It is interdisciplinary in nature, borrowing, adapting and enhancing method and theory from numerous other disciplines such as computer science (e.g. algorithm and software design, database design and theory), geoinformation science (spatial statistics and modeling, geographic information systems), artificial intelligence research (supervised classification, fuzzy logic), ecology (point pattern analysis), applied mathematics (graph theory, probability theory) and statistics.

Training and research 
Scientific progress in archaeology, as in any other discipline, requires building abstract, generalized and transferable knowledge about the processes that underlie past human actions and their manifestations. Quantification provides the ultimate known way of abstracting and extending our scientific abilities past the limits of intuitive cognition. Quantitative approaches to archaeological information handling and inference constitute a critical body of scientific methods in archaeological research. They provide the tools, algebra, statistics and computer algorithms, to process information too voluminous or complex for purely cognitive, informal inference. They also build a bridge between archaeology and numerous quantitative sciences such as geophysics, geoinformation sciences and applied statistics. And they allow archaeological scientists to design and carry out research in a formal, transparent and comprehensible way.

Being an emerging field of research, AI science is currently a rather dispersed discipline in need of stronger, well-funded and institutionalized embedding, especially in academic teaching. Despite its evident progress and usefulness, today's quantitative archaeology is often inadequately represented in archaeological training and education. Part of this problem may be misconceptions about the seeming conflict between mathematics and humanistic archaeology.

Nevertheless, digital excavation technology, modern heritage management and complex research issues require skilled students and researchers to develop new, efficient and reliable means of processing an ever-growing mass of untackled archaeological data and research problems. Thus, providing students of archaeology with a solid background in quantitative sciences such as mathematics, statistics and computer sciences seems today more important than ever.

Currently, universities based in the UK provide the largest share of study programmes for prospective quantitative archaeologists, with more institutes in Italy, Germany and the Netherlands developing a strong profile quickly. In Germany, the country's first lecturer's position in AI science ("Archäoinformatik") was established in 2005 at the University of Kiel. In April 2016 the first full professorship in Archaeoinformatics has been established at the University of Cologne (Institute of Archaeology). 

The most important platform for students and researchers in quantitative archaeology and AI science is the international conference on Computer Applications and Quantitative Methods in Archaeology (CAA) which has been in existence for more than 30 years now and is held in a different city of Europe each year. Vienna's city archaeology unit also hosts an annual event that is quickly growing in international importance (see links at bottom).

References

Further reading 
Roosevelt, Cobb, Moss, Olson, and Ünlüsoy 2015: "Excavation is  Digitization: Advances in Archaeological Practice," Journal of Field Archaeology, Volume 40, Issue 3 (June 2015), pp. 325-346.
Burenhult 2002: Burenhult, G. (ed.): Archaeological Informatics: Pushing The Envelope. CAA2001. Computer Applications and Quantitative Methods in Archaeology. BAR International Series 1016, Archaeopress, Oxford.
Falser, Michael; Juneja, Monica (Eds.): 'Archaeologizing' Heritage? Transcultural Entanglements between Local Social Practices and Global Virtual Realities (Series: Transcultural Research – Heidelberg Studies on Asia and Europe in a Global Context). Springer: Heidelberg/New York, 2013, VIII, 287 p. 200 illus., 90 illus. in color.
Huggett and Ross 2004: J. Huggett, S. Ross (eds.): Archaeological Informatics. Beyond Technology. Internet Archaeology 15. http://intarch.ac.uk/journal/issue15/

Schlapke 2000: Schlapke, M. Die "Archäoinformatik" am Thüringischen Landesamt für Archäologische Denkmalpflege, Ausgrabungen und Funde im Freistaat Thüringen, 5, 2000, S. 1–5.
Zemanek 2004: Zemanek, H.: Archaeological Information - An information scientist looks on archaeology. In: Ausserer, K.F., Börner, w., Goriany, M. & Karlhuber-Vöckl, L. (eds) 2004. Enter the Past. The E-way into the four Dimensions of Cultural Heritage. CAA 2003, Computer Applications and Quantitative Methods in Archaeology. BAR International Series 1227, Archaeopress, Oxford, 16-26.
Archeologia e Calcolatori journal homepage
Archaeological Computing Newsletter homepage, now a supplement to Archeologia e Calcolatori 
Computational archaeology
Computational Archaeology Blog

External links

Studying computational archaeology
University College London: M.Sc. GIS and Spatial Analysis in Archaeology
University of York: MSc Archaeological Information Systems
University of Birmingham: MA/ PG Dip Landscape Archaeology, GIS and Virtual Environments
University of Southampton: MSc in Archaeological Computing (Spatial Technologies) and MSc in Archaeological Computing (Virtual Pasts)
Archaeoinformatics at Siena University (Italian page)
Digital and Computational Archaeology at University of Cologne
Archaeoinformation science at CAU Kiel
University of the Aegean M.Sc. in Cultural Informatics
University of Washington Digital Archaeology Research Lab
The Computational Archaeology Lab at San Diego State University focuses on Open-Science and Open-Source approaches to GIS, Agent Based Modeling, Imagery Analysis, and Computation in archaeology and coupled human-natural systems science.

Research groups and institutions 
University College London: Material Culture and Data Science Research Group
University of York: Archaeological Information Systems Research Group
University of Southampton: Archaeological Computing Research Group
University of Birmingham: HP Visual and Spatial Technology Centre Archaeological Computing Division
Foundation for Research and Technology Hellas (FORTH), Center for Cultural Informatics
Alexandria Archive Institute (AAI)
Internet and Open Source for Archaeology (2004-2013) was a portal dedicated to the collection and creation of resources to help archaeologists evaluate open source alternatives to proprietary software.
Cultural and Educational Technology Institute is a research institute which constitutes an integrated research environment with continuous interaction with the academic community, in particular with the Democritus University of Thrace, the national and European educational and cultural technology industry, the international scientific community and the public sector.
Michigan State University Cultural Heritage Informatics Initiative is a platform for interdisciplinary scholarly collaboration and communication in the domain of Cultural Heritage Informatics at Michigan State University. In addition, the initiative strives to equip students (both graduate and undergraduate) with the practical and analytical skills necessary creatively to apply information, communication, and computing technologies to cultural heritage materials.
Cologne Digital Archaeology Lab (CodArchLab)
ISAAK (Initiative for Statistical Analysis in Archaeology Kiel)

Conferences
"Computer Applications and Quantitative Methods in Archaeology (CAA")
"International Conference on Cultural Heritage and New Technologies" (formerly: "Workshop Archäologie und Computer" at Vienna)

Archaeological IT service providers
L - P : Archaeology
Archaeovision
Oxford Archaeology Digital
Archaeology Data Service
Intrasis GIS
ArcTron (in German)
Open Context: experimental system for archaeological data-sharing
Archaeological Analytics: Digital Content for North American Material Culture

 
Computational fields of study
Archaeological sub-disciplines